Infinite Things is the fifth studio album by British singer Paloma Faith, released through Sony Music on 13 November 2020.

Background
Faith's fourth album The Architect became her first album to reach number one on the UK Albums Chart. Almost a year later, she released a special edition of the album, named the Zeitgeist Edition, containing other songs that were made during the making of the songs from the standard album. Aside from her album, she also became a figure for automobile manufacturing company Škoda, recording two covers "Make Your Own Kind of Music" and "I've Gotta Be Me" for two of their adverts that ran in 2018 and 2019, respectively.

At the end of 2019, she said she would like to release a new album next year.

In early 2020, she released the song "Mistakes" in collaboration with tropical house record producer Jonas Blue, which sparked the first rumours on possibly releasing an album. She talked about the song, saying "I feel so excited about 'Mistakes'. I am a huge fan of MNEK who co-wrote the song and also of the dance power of Jonas. I can't help but move to this tune. It's a banger!"

Just before announcing the album in September 2020, she revealed on her social media that she was pregnant with her second child with her current partner Leyman Lahcine, with whom she already had a three-year-old daughter.

She announced the album under the title Infinite Things on 25 September 2020 and revealed that because of the COVID-19 pandemic, she learned how to engineer the entirety of the record before she penned it to be released and nearly went as far as scrapping it and starting all over again from scratch. She also revealed that, as well as exploring relationships and love, the record is also reflective in topics of sickness and loss.

Faith has also worked with a host of songwriters on the album, including Faouzia, MNEK and Josef Salvat. Sigrid also wrote a song on the album and is the only one that wasn't written by Faith herself, as stated on iTunes.

Singles
The album's lead single, "Better Than This" was released on 5 September 2020, along with an accompanying music video, directed by David Wilson, published onto YouTube a few days after. Faith described the song as one of "enduring love" in a time of violence.

"Gold" was made the album's second single on 29 October 2020. The song is accompanied by a  video filmed in Hackney, which sees Paloma using an abandoned building site as the stage for a dramatic performance alongside a choir and a host of dancers. Faith said about the song, "'Gold' is the only song on the album which wasn't recorded in my basement. It was recorded at Steve Mac's studio, who penned the song with the wonderful Sigrid. As a result it embodies freedom and joy and a celebration of life, perfect escapism for a time when we need to remember we are free spirits. 'Gold' is a song about how the spirit conquers everything and whatever you are going through your true virtues are inside you."

"Monster" was made the album’s third single on 7 May 2021. The official video was released on the same day.

Promotional singles
On 16 October 2020, Faith released "Falling Down" as the first promotional single from the album. "Last Night on Earth" followed on 23 October.

Track listing

Notes
  signifies a vocal producer
  signifies an additional producer
  signifies a miscellaneous or co-producer

Credits and personnel
Credits adapted from the liner notes of Infinite Things.

Performers and musicians

Paloma Faith – vocals
Nosa Apollo – programming 
Kevin Banks – electric guitar 
Zara Benyounes – violin , viola 
Ryan Coughlin – bass guitar , acoustic guitar , electric guitar 
Peter Daley – keys , piano 
Rosie Danvers – cello 
Sam Dixon – bass 
Louis Dowdeswell – trumpet 
Jack Duxbury – synths , guitar , organ , bass 
Grades – drums , bass , keyboards , synthesizer , programming 
Ed Harcourt – background vocals , drums , organ , percussion , piano , synthesizers 
Jamie Hartman – piano 
Jamie N Commons – keys , programming , background vocals 
Tre Jean-Marie – drums , bass , keyboards , synthesizer , programming , piano , guitar , rhodes 
Gita Langley – violin 
Chris Laws – drums 
Nathaniel "Detonate" Ledwidge – keyboard programming , pianos , bass , guitars , drums 
Martin Lovatt – trumpet 
Steve Mac – keyboards 
Janelle Martin – background vocals 
Howard McGill – saxophones 
Naomi Miller – background vocals 
Baby N'Sola – background vocals 
Nayla "Sillkey" Nyassa – piano , organ 
John Parricelli – guitars 
Kerenza Peacock – violin , viola 
Richard Pryce – double bass 
Jordan Riley – drums , keyboards , bass , programming 
Davide Rossi – all strings 
Josef Salvat – background vocals 
Starsmith – guitars , synthesizers , keyboards , drum programming 
Dave Stewart – trombone 
Aisha Stuart – background vocals 
TommyD – keyboard 
Dylan Wiggins – guitar 
Martin Williams – saxophones 
Patrick Wimberly – synths , drum programming , drums , piano , keys 
Wired Strings – strings 
Andy Wood – trombone 

Production

Paloma Faith – vocal production , engineering 
Charlie Handsome – production 
Khaya Cohen – additional production 
Mark Crew – production , recording , mixing 
James Cunningham – assistant mix engineering 
Rosie Danvers – string arranging , brass arranging , arranging 
Nat Dunn – vocal production , engineering 
Duncan Fuller – assistant engineering 
Chris Gehringer – mastering
Serban Ghenea – mixing 
Grades – production 
John Hanes – mix engineering 
Ed Harcourt – production , engineering , recording 
Jamie Hartman – production 
Tre Jean-Marie – production , additional production 
Chris Laws – engineering 
Nathaniel "Detonate" Ledwidge – production , engineering 
Steve Mac – production 
Jamie McEvoy – vocal production , engineering 
Dann Pursey – engineering 
James F. Reynolds – mixing 
Jordan Riley – production 
Miles B.A. Robinson – engineering 
Jamie Snell – mixing 
Starsmith – production 
Styalz – production 
TommyD – string session production 
Ewan Vickery – mixing assistant 
Martin Williams – brass arranging 
Patrick Wimberly – production , engineering 
Lewis Wright – engineering 

Design and art direction

Theo Adams – creative direction
Phoebe Arnold – styling
Louie Banks – cover photography
Chieska Fortune-Smith – photography
Danny Hyland – set design
Eamonn Hughes – hairstyling
Imarni – nails
Chris Murdoch – creative production
Nick Royal – styling
Masumi Saito – movement direction
Daniel Sällström – makeup
Leandro Pitz Schroeder – art direction

Charts

Certifications

Release history

References

2020 albums
Paloma Faith albums
Sony Music albums
Albums produced by Tre Jean-Marie